Nelson Agostini Xavier (30 August 1941 – 10 May 2017) was a Brazilian actor. He appeared in more than 95 films and television shows between 1959 and 2017. He starred in the 1964 film Os Fuzis, which won the Silver Bear Extraordinary Jury Prize at the 14th Berlin International Film Festival.

In 1976 Xavier co-directed A Queda along with Ruy Guerra, a sequel to Os Fuzis. It was entered into the 28th Berlin International Film Festival, where it won the Silver Bear – Special Jury Prize.

Xavier died on 10 May 2017 in Uberlândia, Minas Gerais, of a lung disease.  He was 75.

Selected filmography

 Fronteiras do Inferno (1959)
 Cidade Ameaçada (1960)
 Os Fuzis (1964) - Mário
 Seara Vermelha (1964)
 A Falecida (1965) - Timbira
 Três Histórias de Amor (1966) - (segment "A Construção - Amor na Cidade")
 Arrastão (1967)
 El ABC do Amor (1967) - (segment "Pacto, O")
 Massacre no Supermercado (1968) - Detective Chico
 Desesperato (1968)
 Of Gods and the Undead (1970) - Valu
 Jardim de Guerra (1970)
 É Simonal (1970)
 Dois Perdidos numa Noite Suja (1971) - Paco
 As Confissões de Frei Abóbora (1971)
 A culpa (1971) - Henrique
 Vai Trabalhar, Vagabundo! (1972) - Babalu
 Ovelha Negra, Uma Despedida de Solteiro (1974)
 A Rainha Diaba (1974) - Catitu
 Dona Flor and Her Two Husbands (1976) - Mirandão, Vadinho's Buddy
 Soledade, a Bagaceira (1976)
 Marília e Marina (1976)
 Gordos e Magros (1976) - Benedito
 Feminino Plural (1976)
 A Queda (1978, director) - Mário
 O Bandido Antonio Do (1978)
 O Bom Burguês (1979) - Comandante Raul
 A Rainha do Rádio (1979)
 Amor e Traição (1979)
 Bububu no Bobobó (1980)
 Eles Não Usam Black-Tie (1981)
 Tensão no Rio (1982) - Colonel Flores
 Gabriela (1983) - Capitão
 O Mágico e o Delegado (1983) - Dom Velasquez
 O Cangaceiro Trapalhão (1983) - Lampião
 Para Viver um Grande Amor (1984) - Carioca
 O Rei do Rio (1985) - Nico
 Moon over Parador (1988) - General Sinaldo
 Césio 137 - O Pesadelo de Goiânia (1990) - Devair
 At Play in the Fields of the Lord (1991) - Father Xantes
 Vai Trabalhar, Vagabundo II - A Volta (1991)
 Lamarca (1994)
 Boca (1994) - Father Silva
 Sombras de Julho (1995)
 O Testamento do Senhor Napumoceno (1997) - Napumoceno
 Anjo Mau (1997, TV Series) - Manoel
 Girl from Rio (2001) - Bichero
 Lua Cambará - Nas Escadarias do Palácio (2002) - Líder dos Ciganos
 Benjamim (2003) - Dr. Cantagalo
 Narradores de Javé (2003) - Zaqueu
 Sítio do Picapau Amarelo (2007) - Barão de Tremembé
 Sonhos Roubados (2009) - Seu Horcio
 Chico Xavier (2010) - Chico Xavier 1969 - 1975
 Os Sonhos de um Sonhador: A História de Frank Aguiar (2010) - Chico das Dores
 As Mães de Chico Xavier (2010) - Chico Xavier
 O Filme dos Espíritos (2011) - Levy
 O Gerente (2011)
 A Despedida (2014) - Almirante
 Trash (2014) - Clemente
 A Floresta Que Se Move (2015) - Heitor
 Babilonia (2015, TV Series) - Sebastião Carvalho
 Rondon, o Desbravador (2016)
 Comeback: Um Matador Nunca se Aposenta (2016) - Amador

References

External links

1941 births
2017 deaths
20th-century Brazilian male actors
21st-century Brazilian male actors
Brazilian film directors
Brazilian male film actors
Male actors from São Paulo
Deaths from lung disease